Eric Woodburn (né Eric Melville Reis; 9 March 189425 October 1981) was a Scottish stage, film and television actor. Prior to this he had a long career on the stage and was also a noted baritone singer.

His most important role was as Doctor Alexander Snoddie in Doctor Finlay's Casebook. He also played the father of Lance Corporal Jones in the Museum Piece episode of Dad's Army.

Filmography

References

External links 
 

1894 births
1981 deaths
Scottish male stage actors
Scottish male film actors
Scottish male television actors
Male actors from Glasgow
20th-century Scottish male actors